Ergane may refer to:
 Athena, as Athena Ergane, the patron goddess of craftsmen and artisans
 Ergane (spider), a genus of jumping spiders